The 198th Infantry Brigade, was first formed as part of the United States Army Reserve's 99th Division. It was active from 1967 through 1971 and has been active since 2007 as an Infantry Training Brigade as part of the US Army Infantry School at Fort Benning, Georgia.

Operational history

Vietnam War 
During the years of 1967–1971 as part of the Vietnam War the 198th was part of the United States Army's 23rd "Americal" Infantry Division. In 1968, elements of the 198th Infantry Brigade, under the leadership of Lieutenant Colonel Robert B. Nelson, participated in the Battle of Kham Duc. On 21 November 1969, Colonel Joseph G. Clemons, (of Pork Chop Hill fame), assumed command of the 198th Infantry Brigade.

Order of battle 
Headquarters & Headquarters Company
 1st Battalion, 6th Infantry
 1st Battalion, 46th Infantry
 5th Battalion, 46th Infantry
 1st Battalion, 52nd Infantry
 4th Battalion, 3rd Infantry (1971)
 1st Battalion, 14th Artillery
9th Support Battalion
155th Engineer Company
 Troop H, 17th Cavalry

Post Vietnam 
The 198th Infantry Brigade was reactivated on 15 May 2007 at Fort Benning, Georgia to serve as an Infantry Training Brigade.
Headquarters & Support Company
 1st Battalion, 19th Infantry
 2nd Battalion, 19th Infantry
 1st Battalion, 46th Infantry
 2nd Battalion, 47th Infantry
 1st Battalion, 50th Infantry
 2nd Battalion, 54th Infantry
 2nd Battalion, 58th Infantry

See also 
Battle of Kham Duc

References 
"The United States Army Infantry Brigade"
"The Brigade: A History, Its Organization and Employment in the US Army"
Summers, Harry G. Historical Atlas of the Vietnam War. New York: Houghton Mifflin Company.

External links 
 

Training brigades of the United States Army
198
198th Light
Military units and formations established in 1967